The Legislature II of Italy was the 2nd legislature of the Italian Republic, and lasted from 25 June 1953 until 11 June 1958. Its composition was the one resulting from the general election of 7 June 1953.

Main chronology
The election was characterized by changes in the electoral law. Even if the general structure remained uncorrupted, the government introduced a superbonus of two thirds of seats in the Chamber of Deputies for the coalition which would obtain at-large the absolute majority of votes. The change was hugely opposed by the opposition parties as well as the smaller DC coalition partners, which had no realistic chances of success. The new law was called Scam Law by its detractors, including some dissidents of minor government parties who founded special opposition groups to deny the artificial landslide to the DC.

The complaint campaign of the oppositions against the Scam Law reached its goal. The Centrist coalition (DC, PSDI, PLI, PRI) won 49.9% of the national vote, coming just a few thousand votes short of the threshold for a two-thirds majority. Instead, the election resulted in an ordinary proportional distribution of the seats. Minor dissident parties resulted determinant for the final result, especially the short-lived National Democratic Alliance (ADN). Technically, the government won the election, with a clear working majority of seats in both houses. But frustration at the failure to garner the expected supermajority caused big problems for the leading coalition. De Gasperi was forced to resign and the legislature continued with many weak governments, with minor parties refusing institutional responsibilities. Because of the extreme governmental instability and the consequent absence of considerable reforms proposed by the government, the legislature was later defined by some historians "the lost legislature".

After De Gasperi lost the support of the Parliament, Giuseppe Pella rose to power, but fell after five months only, following strong disputes about the status of the Free Territory of Trieste which Pella was claiming. Amintore Fanfani not receiving a vote of confidence, Mario Scelba and Antonio Segni followed with more traditional centrist coalitions supported by PSDI and PLI: under the administration of the first one, the problem of Trieste was closed ceding Koper to Yugoslavia. The parliamentary term was closed by the minority government chaired by Adone Zoli, finishing a legislature which hugely weakened the office of the Prime Minister, held by six different rulers. Zoli himself governed for more than one year as a care-taker Prime Minister, after having resigned when the neo-fascist MSI resulted decisive in the government's investiture confidence vote. Zoli remained in office after being invited by President Gronchi to govern until the natural dissolution of the legislature in 1958.

Presidential election
On 28 April 1955 the Parliament met to elect the second President of Italy. On 29 April 1955 the President of the Chamber of Deputies Giovanni Gronchi was elected on the fourth ballot with 658 votes out of 843.

Government

De Gasperi VIII Cabinet

No confidence granted.

Pella Cabinet

Fanfani I Cabinet

No confidence granted.

Scelba Cabinet

Segni I Cabinet

Zoli Cabinet

Parliamentary composition

Chamber of Deputies

 President: 
Giovanni Gronchi (DC), elected on 25 June 1953 and resigned on 29 April 1955;
Giovanni Leone (DC), elected on 10 May 1955.
 Vice Presidents: Giovanni Leone (DC, until 10 May 1955), Gaetano Martino (PLI, until 10 February 1954), Cino Macrelli (Ind, from 5 March 1954), Edoardo D'Onofrio (PCI), Ferdinando Targetti (PSI), Giuseppe Rapelli (DC, from 27 September 1955)

Senate of the Republic

 President: Cesare Merzagora (Ind), elected on 25 June 1953
 Vice Presidents: Michele De Pietro (DC, until 17 January 1954 and then from 4 July 1957), Giorgio Bo (DC, until 18 May 1957), Mauro Scoccimarro (PCI), Enrico Molé (PSDI), Mario Cingolani (DC, from 24 February 1954)

Senators for Life

References

Legislatures of Italy
1953 establishments in Italy
1958 disestablishments in Italy